Pliny may refer to:

People 
 Pliny the Elder (23–79 CE), ancient Roman nobleman, scientist, historian, and author of Naturalis Historia (Pliny's Natural History)
 Pliny the Younger (died 113), ancient Roman statesman, orator, writer, and Pliny the Elder's nephew and adopted son 
 Pliny Chase (1820–1886), American scientist, mathematician, and educator
 Pliny Earle (disambiguation), several people
 Pliny Fisk III (born 1944), co-founder and co-director of the Center for Maximum Potential Building Systems (CMPBS)
 Pliny Earle Goddard (1869–1928), American linguist and ethnologist
 Pliny Norcross (1838–1915), Wisconsin politician
 Pliny W. Williamson (1876–1958), New York politician

Places 
 Pliny, West Virginia, United States
 Pliny Township, Minnesota, United States

Beers 
 Pliny the Elder, the flagship beer of the Russian River Brewing Company
 Pliny the Younger (beer), a seasonal (February) beer of the Russian River Brewing Company

See also 
 Plinia, a genus of the botanical family Myrtaceae
 Plinian eruption, a type of volcanic eruption similar to AD 79 eruption of Mount Vesuvius
 Plinio (disambiguation)
 Plinius (crater), a lunar impact crater

Masculine given names